The Fording River Coal Mine is a coal mine located in British Columbia, Canada. The mine has coal reserves amounting to 263.8 million tonnes of coking coal, one of the largest coal reserves in Canada and the world. The mine has an annual production capacity of 8.34 million tonnes of coal.

See also 
List of coal mines in Canada

References 

Coal mines in Canada
Teck Resources
Mines in British Columbia